The 106th Battalion (Nova Scotia Rifles), CEF  was a unit in the Canadian Expeditionary Force during the First World War.  Based in Truro, Nova Scotia, with two additional companies in Pictou and Springhill, the unit began recruiting on 18 November 1915. The battalion was the first rifle regiment in Maritime Canada. The battalion sailed to England on 16 July 1916 and trained at Lower Dibgate, Shorncliffe. It was later broken up and most members were absorbed into the 40th Battalion (Nova Scotia), CEF.

Its first commanding officer was Walter Allen, a carriage maker in Truro who had been active in the pre-war militia and had joined the 17th Battalion as a captain in 1914. When the 17th became a reserve unit, he was promoted to major and transferred into the 15th Battalion but lasted less than a month before being wounded. He was sent home, then was appointed commanding officer of the 106th, presumably on the basis of his brief battlefield experience. His unusual wound was under investigation, however, and two months later he was court-martialled for "behaving in a scandalous manner, unbecoming the character of an officer and a gentleman." His improbable replacement was Robert Innes, a twenty-four-year-old major from Coldbrook, Nova Scotia, then living in Ottawa, who had militia experience but also, it would appear, Conservative party connections.

Private Jeremiah Jones, who enlisted with the 106th Battalion, was awarded the Canadian Forces Medallion for Distinguished Service for valour at the Battle of Vimy Ridge with The Royal Canadian Regiment.

The 106th Battalion is perpetuated by The Nova Scotia Highlanders.

References 

 Brian Douglas Tennyson, Nova Scotia at War 1914-1919 (Nimbus, 2017)

External links 
 Profile of Cpl. James Swan
 Profile of Pvt. Calvin Swan

See also 

 Military history of Canada
 History of the Canadian Army

Military units and formations established in 1915
1915 establishments in Nova Scotia
Battalions of the Canadian Expeditionary Force
Military units and formations disestablished in 1918
Truro, Nova Scotia
1918 disestablishments in Canada
Nova Scotia Highlanders
North Nova Scotia Highlanders